, or ) is an uninhabited Japanese island in the Pacific Ocean.  The volcanic island is part of the Izu Islands.

Geography
The roughly circular-shaped island is listed as a Class A active volcano by the Japan Meteorological Agency. The island is the above-water portion of a submarine volcano, whose submerged caldera portion to the north of the island continues to erupt underwater. Volcanic activity on the island itself was last recorded in 2002, accompanied by earthquake swarms.

History

Tori-shima was known to Japanese fishermen and mariners since at least the early Edo period, but was uninhabited aside from occasional shipwreck survivors. In 1841, 14-year-old Nakahama Manjirō and four friends were shipwrecked on Tori-shima until rescued by the American whaleship John Howland commanded by William H. Whitfield. Japanese writer Akira Yoshimura researched and wrote about 15 similar instances. The island was settled in Meiji period, with the primary economic activity being the gathering of guano from the abundant short-tailed albatross, who use the island as their nesting grounds. A major volcanic eruption was recorded in 1871. The island was administratively grouped with the Ogasawara islands in August 1898, but was transferred to the administration of Hachijojima in April 1901. The population of 150 inhabitants was killed by a major volcanic eruption in 1902. Torishima was never repopulated.

Since the 1930s, the Yamashina Institute for Ornithology has taken a very active role in researching and attempting to preserve the local seabird species, especially the short-tailed albatross, which had been reduced to an estimated 50 birds by 1933. The Japan Meteorological Agency established a weather station and volcanic research station on the island in 1947, but this was abandoned in 1965 due to volcanic activity and earthquakes. On November 1, 1954 Tori-shima was proclaimed a protected bird sanctuary. This designation was increased to that of a protected national Natural monument on May 10, 1965. It can only be visited by research scientists with special permission, and landing on the island is very difficult due to heavy seas and lack of suitable landing beaches or facilities. Tour boats which take people around the island to view the birds are popular, but these tours are not permitted to land on the island. Researchers normally travel to the island by chartered government helicopter.

Tori-shima, along with the other Izu Islands, is officially part of Tokyo Metropolis, and also falls within the borders of the Fuji-Hakone-Izu National Park.

Flora and fauna
Repeated volcanic eruptions in 1939 and 2002 have set the flora on Tori-shima back to initial stages in the ecological succession. Plants such as Vitex rotundifolia and hydrangea are found near the shoreline, and Chrysanthemum pacificum and Japanese black pine in sheltered areas inland, but most of the central portion of the island remains as volcanic ash and rock.

The island is home to several tens of thousands of breeding pairs of Tristram's storm petrel and other birds such as Japanese murrelet, black-footed albatross, common kestrel, and blue rock thrush, but the short-tailed albatross population has been very slow to recover, with recovery hampered by the presence of large numbers of black rats, the only remaining mammal on the island. Humpback whales and dolphins often appear around the island during migration and breeding seasons. Tori-shima is the primary and one of only two remaining breeding sites for the short-tailed albatross. The island has been recognised as an Important Bird Area (IBA) by BirdLife International.

See also

 List of volcanoes in Japan
 List of islands of Japan
 List of islands
 Desert island

Notes

References
 Teikoku's Complete Atlas of Japan, Teikoku-Shoin Co., Ltd. Tokyo 1990,

External links

Short Tailed Albatross
Tori-shima from the north
Map of Torishima by Japan Meteorological Agency 
Yamashina Research Institute page on Torishima with photos 

Tori-shima Location and description of island and volcano.
Tori-shima  Enlargement of the excellent aerial photo of the island from the south in the previous link.
Izu-torishima  Photos during and after 2002 eruption.

Izu Islands
Uninhabited islands of Japan
Active volcanoes
Former populated places in Japan
20th-century volcanic events
1902 natural disasters
1902 in Japan
Volcanic eruptions in Japan
Islands of Tokyo
Important Bird Areas of the Nanpo Islands
Seabird colonies